Edwin Alfred Rickards (1872–1920) was an English architect.

Early life
Rickards was born in 1872.

Career

Rickards worked alongside the architects Henry Vaughan Lanchester and James Stewart. He specialized in baroque architecture. He designed the Methodist Central Hall in Westminster, London, in 1907.

Rickards' portrait was done by Frank Waldo Murray.

Designed the Great Britain pavilion at the Venice Beinnale (1909).

Death and legacy
Rickards died on 29 August 1920. He appeared as a fictional character in Arnold Bennett's 1918 novel titled The Roll-Call.

References

1872 births
1920 deaths
20th-century English architects
Baroque Revival architects